Vidya Vardhaka Sangha High School is a school in Kadaganchi. It was started in 1950.

References

External links

Schools in Kalaburagi district
Educational institutions established in 1950
1950 establishments in Mysore State